The World Group was the highest level of Fed Cup competition in 2003. Sixteen nations competed in a four-round knockout competition. Slovakia was the defending champion, but they were defeated in the quarterfinals by Belgium. France defeated United States in the final to win their second title and claim the World No. 1 ranking.

Participating Teams

Draw

First round

Slovakia vs. Germany

Austria vs. Belgium

Italy vs. Sweden

Czech Republic vs. United States

Russia vs. Croatia

Slovenia vs. Argentina

France vs. Colombia

Australia vs. Spain

Quarterfinals

Slovakia vs. Belgium

Italy vs. United States

Russia vs. Slovenia

France vs. Spain

Semifinals

Belgium vs. United States

Russia vs. France

Final

United States vs. France

References

See also
Fed Cup structure

World Group